Marlett is a TrueType font that has been used in Microsoft Windows since Windows 95. The operating system uses this font to create user interface icons that are used in the menus and windows. Examples are the close, maximize and minimize buttons that are made from the individual glyphs in the font. This was important to allow the users to scale the user interface and have the icons scale with the elements.''

Character layout
Due to the specialised nature of the Marlett glyphs, many of the mappings shown are approximate.

See also

 MouseText (a set of bitmapped characters used in later Apple II models for a similar function)

Footnotes

References

External links
A bit about Marlett on MSDN Blogs
Marlett Characters documented by React OS

Symbol typefaces
Windows XP typefaces